In economics, King–Plosser–Rebelo preferences are a particular functional form of utility that is used in many macroeconomic models and dynamic stochastic general equilibrium models. Having originally been proposed in an article that appeared in the Journal of Monetary Economics in 1988, the corresponding technical appendix detailing their derivation has only been published in 2002.

Strict concavity of the utility function implies .
For  or   the utility function has the multiplicatively separable form

where  is increasing and concave if   or decreasing and convex if . Further restrictions are required to assure overall concavity of the momentarily utility function.
In the limit case of  the resulting preferences specification is additively separable and given by

where  is increasing and concave.

The reason for the prevalence of this preference specification in macroeconomics is that they are compatible with balanced growth along the optimal steady state. Hence, they are used in many dynamic stochastic general equilibrium models, which are typically derived from the neoclassical growth model. The reason for their compatibility with balanced growth is twofold. First, having a constant interest rate in steady state, the growth rate of marginal utility must be constant, which is the case here. Second, having a finite time endowment, balanced growth together with an optimal choice of labor by the agents implies that income and substitution effect of the increase in real wages due to productivity increases must cancel each other.

Shortcut to achieve balanced growth compatibility
To have additively separable preferences along with balanced growth, some studies use the shortcut of introducing a scaling factor containing the level of labor augmenting technology before the leisure term. An example of such a utility function would be

Where   denotes the inverse of the Frisch elasticity of labor supply and z is the level of labor augmenting technology.

Relationship to other common macroeconomic preference types
KPR-preferences are one polar case nested in Jaimovich–Rebelo preferences. The latter allow to freely scale the wealth effect on the labor supply. The other polar case is the Greenwood–Hercowitz–Huffman preferences, where the wealth effect on the labor supply is completely shut off. However, this naturally implies that they are incompatible with a balanced growth path.

References

Neoclassical economics
Utility function types